Eiður Smári Guðjohnsen (transliterated as Eidur Smari Gudjohnsen; born 15 September 1978) is an Icelandic professional football coach and former player who played as a forward. Eiður saw his greatest success in England and Spain with Chelsea and Barcelona respectively, where he won the UEFA Champions League and La Liga with the latter and the League Cup and Premiership twice with the former. Along with two spells at Bolton Wanderers fourteen years apart, he also played in Iceland, the Netherlands, France, Greece, Belgium, China, Norway and India in a club career lasting 23 years.

Eiður is the son of Arnór Guðjohnsen, who was also an Icelandic international footballer. He made his full international debut for Iceland as a substitute for his father in 1996, and is the nation's joint top scorer of all time with 26 international goals in 88 caps between 1996 and 2016. He was the captain of the Iceland national team until Ólafur Jóhannesson took over the role of manager. He was part of their squad that reached the quarter-finals of UEFA Euro 2016, their first major tournament.

Club career

Early career
After spending the 1994 season with Valur in Reykjavík, Eiður played for PSV in the Netherlands from 1995, playing alongside Ronaldo. Following a serious ankle injury, he returned home to play for KR Reykjavík.

Bolton Wanderers
Eiður signed with English club Bolton Wanderers in 1998. He made his debut in September 1998 in a match against Birmingham City. By March the following year, Eiður had become a regular member of the Bolton first team, and the following season, he scored 21 times in all competitions as the Trotters reached the Division One play-offs and the semi-finals of both the FA Cup and the League Cup.

Chelsea

On 19 June 2000, Eiður was signed by Premier League club Chelsea for a fee of £4.5 million. He was the second striker signed by the Blues that pre-season, after Dutch international Jimmy Floyd Hasselbaink.

Eiður made his debut on 13 August in the 2000 FA Charity Shield at Wembley Stadium, replacing Gianfranco Zola for the final 17 minutes of a 2–0 win over Manchester United. He spent most of his first season in London being used as a substitute, but was still able to score 13 times. In his second season, he formed a partnership with Hasselbaink which provided 52 goals for Chelsea in all competitions.

Following the appointment of José Mourinho as manager, Eiður eventually played in a more withdrawn role as he helped the club win two successive Premier League titles. On 23 October 2004, he scored a hat-trick in a 4–0 home win over Blackburn Rovers.

Barcelona

On 14 June 2006, Eiður was signed by La Liga club Barcelona in an £8 million transfer on a four-year contract, as a replacement for Henrik Larsson.

He made his debut on 20 August in the second leg of the 2006 Supercopa de España, as a half-time substitute in a 3–0 win at the Camp Nou against RCD Espanyol (4–0 aggregate). Eight days later in his league debut away to Celta de Vigo, he replaced Ludovic Giuly with 16 minutes remaining and scored the winning goal in a 3–2 victory.

He was part of the Treble-winning side in 2008–09 as Barcelona won La Liga, the Copa del Rey and the UEFA Champions League.

Monaco and return to England
Eiður joined Ligue 1 club Monaco, on 31 August 2009, signing a two-year deal for a £1.8 million fee.

On 28 January 2010, Tottenham Hotspur manager Harry Redknapp confirmed that Eiður had joined the club on loan for the remainder of the 2009–10 season, despite undergoing a medical at West Ham United. The striker was offered identical deals by both clubs; however, Eiður opted to join Spurs. On 31 August 2010, Eiður signed for Stoke City on a one-year deal and made his debut for Stoke on 18 September in a 1–1 draw against West Ham. After only making five substitute appearances for Stoke, Eiður left on the final day of the January transfer window to join Fulham on loan. On 31 January 2011, Eiður signed on loan to Fulham until the end of the 2010–11 season. After an unsuccessful time at Stoke, he was released at the end of the 2010–11 season.

AEK Athens
On 19 July 2011, Eiður signed a two-year deal with Greek club AEK Athens, keeping him at the club until 2013, despite further interest from English club West Ham as well as Welsh side Swansea City. He was greeted by over 2,500 AEK fans at Athens International Airport.

Shortly after signing a new two-year contract with AEK, Eiður stated to the press after he was greeted by the AEK fans, "It was unbelievable, I have played and been in many countries but I have never seen anything like this before. It really made me feel welcomed. I was informed that I would have been greeted but this was not what I had in mind. I am a 100% sure I have made the right choice going to AEK. I have come for trophies and nothing else. The least thing I can do is help AEK achieve their expectations after the way I was greeted at the airport."

On 15 October 2011, in the derby match against Olympiakos, Eiður was injured in the 44th minute following a collision with opposition goalkeeper Franco Costanzo. The diagnosis was a fractured tibia and fibula which kept him out for the remainder of the season.

Move to Belgium

Eiður traveled to the United States in September 2012 for a trial with Major League Soccer club Seattle Sounders FC. He played one match for their reserve team against Chivas USA's reserves and scored a goal.

On 2 October 2012, Eiður signed with Belgian Pro League side Cercle Brugge, signing a contract until the end of the season. On 13 January 2013, after an impressive first half of the season with Cercle Brugge, Eiður signed a one-and-a-half-year contract with city rivals Club Brugge for an estimated amount of €300,000.

Return to Bolton
After leaving Club Brugge at the end of his contract, Eiður began training with former club Bolton Wanderers in November 2014. On 5 December, he signed for Bolton for the remainder of the 2014–15 season.

He made his second debut for the club as a second-half substitute for Darren Pratley in a goalless draw with Ipswich Town at the Macron Stadium on 13 December, the same opponents against whom Eiður had made the last appearance of his previous Bolton spell against in May 2000.

On 4 April 2015, Bolton manager Neil Lennon said that the week had been one of the best of Eiður's career, as he had returned and scored for Iceland after two years without a cap and six years without an international goal, equalised in stoppage time for Bolton against Blackpool and became a father for the fourth time in that week.

Later career
Eiður joined Chinese Super League club Shijiazhuang Ever Bright in July 2015 on an undisclosed contract. In February the following year he signed for Norwegian Tippeligaen side Molde on a two-year contract. He was released from his contract with Molde in August 2016, In 2016, he signed for Indian Super League outfit FC Pune City as a marquee foreigner but after the sudden injury, he was ruled out of the entire season. In September 2017, he retired from professional football.

International career
Eiður made his debut for the Iceland under-17 national team in 1992 at the age of 14. He went on to score seven goals in 26 appearances for the team before progressing to the under-19 side in 1994. He netted twice in nine caps for the under-19s, before making his debut for the U-21 side later in the year. He represented the U-21s for four years, scoring a total of four goals in 11 caps.

On 24 April 1996, 17-year-old Eiður and his 34-year-old father Arnór entered football history when playing in an international friendly for the senior Iceland team against Estonia in Tallinn. Arnór started the match, and Eiður came on in the second half as a substitute for his father. Both father and son have later expressed bitterness at the fact that they were not allowed to play together in that match. The then president of the Football Association of Iceland, Eggert Magnússon, gave the coach Logi Ólafsson an express order to not play them together because he wanted it to occur on home turf, when Iceland played Macedonia two months later in the first qualification round for the 1998 FIFA World Cup. As it happened, however, the two never got another chance because a month after the match in Estonia Eiður broke his leg playing for the Icelandic U-18 team against the Republic of Ireland. He had difficulty coming back because of undiagnosed tendinitis in that leg. When he had recovered and was again available for selection for the national team, his father had retired.

On 2 September 2006, Eiður scored in a 3–0 away victory over Northern Ireland in UEFA Euro 2008 qualifying, pulling him level with Ríkharður Jónsson's record of 17 international goals (the latter had held the record since his third goal in 1948, and totalled 17 in 33 matches from 1947 to 1965). On 13 October 2007, his 48th cap, Eiður broke a six-match international drought with two goals in a 2–4 home qualifier defeat to Latvia to become Iceland's top scorer of all time. He said that the record was made less important by the day's defeat.

Eiður announced his possible retirement from international football after Iceland's 2–0 defeat against Croatia on 19 November 2013 in a play-off for a place at the 2014 World Cup.

On 28 March 2015, he made a goal-scoring return to the national team after 18 months away, opening a 3–0 win over Kazakhstan at the Astana Arena in Euro 2016 qualifying.

He was selected for Iceland's Euro 2016 squad at the age of 37. He appeared twice, both as a substitute. He came on late in their second group match against Hungary which ended 1–1. Iceland then surprised everyone by progressing into the last 16, where they caused another shock after defeating England 2–1. He came on and was given the captain's armband in the 82nd minute in their quarter-final match against tournament hosts France. They lost 5–2 and were eliminated, which was his last international match.

Personal life
In September 2001, Eiður, Chelsea teammates John Terry, Frank Lampard and Jody Morris, and Leicester City's Frank Sinclair, were drunk and unruly in a Heathrow Airport hotel containing many Americans left stranded by the September 11 attacks. The Chelsea quartet were each fined two weeks' wages, totalling around £100,000, which was donated to the 9/11 relief efforts.

In January 2003, Eiður admitted to a gambling problem, confessing to having lost £400,000 in casinos over a five-month period.

Eiður's half-brother, named Arnór like their father, signed for Swansea City in July 2017, at the age of 16.

Eiður has one daughter and three sons, all of the sons play football at different levels. His eldest, Sveinn Aron (born 1998) is a professional with Swedish Allsvenskan side IF Elfsborg. Middle son Andri Lucas (born 2002) plays for Swedish side IFK Norrköping. His youngest, Daníel Tristán (born 2006) is in the Malmö FF academy program.

Coaching career
In January 2019, Eiður was hired as the assistant manager for the Iceland national under-21 football team under newly appointed manager Arnar Viðarsson.

On 16 July 2020, Eiður took over as manager of FH, along with Logi Ólafsson.

After initially signing a contract extension with FH for the 2021 season, Eiður left the team in December 2020, and took over as an assistant manager of the Iceland men's national team.

Career statistics

Club

International
Appearances and goals by national team and year

Scores and results show Iceland's goal tally first

Honours
Chelsea
Premier League: 2004–05, 2005–06
Football League Cup: 2004–05
FA Charity/Community Shield: 2000, 2005

Barcelona
La Liga: 2008–09
Copa del Rey: 2008–09
Supercopa de España: 2006, 2009
UEFA Champions League: 2008–09
UEFA Super Cup: 2009

Individual
Icelandic Footballer of the Year: 2001, 2003, 2004, 2005, 2006, 2008, 2009

References

External links

 
 
 
 

1978 births
Living people
Eidur Gudjohnsen
Eidur Gudjohnsen
Association football forwards
Eidur Gudjohnsen
Eidur Gudjohnsen
Eidur Gudjohnsen
Eidur Gudjohnsen
Eidur Gudjohnsen
PSV Eindhoven players
Eidur Gudjohnsen
Bolton Wanderers F.C. players
Chelsea F.C. players
FC Barcelona players
AS Monaco FC players
Tottenham Hotspur F.C. players
Stoke City F.C. players
Fulham F.C. players
AEK Athens F.C. players
Cangzhou Mighty Lions F.C. players
Molde FK players
English Football League players
Premier League players
La Liga players
Eredivisie players
Ligue 1 players
Super League Greece players
Chinese Super League players
Eliteserien players
Expatriate footballers in England
Eidur Gudjohnsen
Expatriate footballers in Greece
Eidur Gudjohnsen
Expatriate footballers in the Netherlands
Eidur Gudjohnsen
Expatriate footballers in Spain
Eidur Gudjohnsen
Expatriate footballers in Monaco
Eidur Gudjohnsen
Expatriate footballers in Belgium
Eidur Gudjohnsen
Expatriate footballers in China
Eidur Gudjohnsen
Expatriate footballers in Norway
Eidur Gudjohnsen
Cercle Brugge K.S.V. players
Belgian Pro League players
Club Brugge KV players
Eidur Gudjohnsen
Eidur Gudjohnsen
Eidur Gudjohnsen
UEFA Euro 2016 players
UEFA Champions League winning players
Guðjohnsen family
FA Cup Final players
Icelandic football managers
Fimleikafélag Hafnarfjarðar managers